The 2007 Songkhla bombings took place in Songkhla Province, Thailand on 27 and 28 May 2007, and are believed to be part of the ongoing south Thailand insurgency. At least four people were killed and 36 were injured.

The explosions started in Hat Yai when a string of seven bomb blasts that injured 13 people in Hat Yai. Most of the bombs were hidden in garbage bins and detonated nearly at the same time starting at 21:00. But one bomb was hurled into JB Hat Yai Hotel and another exploded in front of Hat Yai Garden Hotel.

The following day, a bomb exploded in front of a busy market in the Saba Yoi. The bomb, which exploded shortly after 16:00, was hidden in a motorcycle parked in front of the market next to a railway station. The motorcycle was destroyed by the blast, and a nearby car damaged, as were dozens of stalls belonging to fruit and vegetable vendors. The bombs were the first terrorist attacks in Songkhla since the south Thailand insurgency reignited in November 2004.

South Thailand insurgency
Terrorist incidents in Thailand in 2007
Songkhla province
Improvised explosive device bombings in Thailand
Islamic terrorism in Thailand
Religiously motivated violence in Thailand
Attacks in Asia in 2007
Mass murder in 2007
2007 crimes in Thailand
Attacks in Thailand